The Hound of the Baskervilles is a 1929 German silent mystery film directed by Richard Oswald and starring Carlyle Blackwell, Alexander Murski, Livio Pavanelli. The film is an adaptation of the 1902 Sherlock Holmes novel The Hound of the Baskervilles by Arthur Conan Doyle. It was the last Sherlock Holmes adaptation in the silent film era. The film boasted an unusually international cast, including American actor Carlyle Blackwell, German actor Fritz Rasp, Russian actor Alexander Murski and Italian actor Livio Pavanelli.

In 2009, a tape with this film (and other lost films of the silent cinema era) was discovered in the basement of the local church in Sosnowiec, Poland.
In 2019, Flicker Alley released the film, digitally restored on DVD and Blu-ray, along with the 1914 version.

Plot summary

Cast

Production
Richard Oswald had penned an earlier adaptation of Conan Doyle's tale for the 1914 serial Der Hund von Baskerville. This version was not a remake of that serial but was a straight adaptation of the source material.

The British-based American actor Carlyle Blackwell was hired to play Holmes, as he was "suitably Britannic".

The film's sets were designed by the art director Willy Schiller. It was shot at the Staaken Studios in Berlin. Critic Troy Howarth said "The film was a commercial disaster, ending the German cinema's fascination with (Sherlock) Holmes until 1936—with yet another version of The Hound of the Baskervilles".

References

External links
 
 

Films based on The Hound of the Baskervilles
1929 films
Films of the Weimar Republic
German mystery films
German silent feature films
1929 mystery films
Films directed by Richard Oswald
Films set in London
Films set in England
Films shot at Staaken Studios
Sherlock Holmes films
German black-and-white films
Silent mystery films
Silent thriller films
1920s German films